Patrick Doody (born April 22, 1992) is a retired American soccer player who last played for the Chicago Fire in the MLS.

Career

Youth College
Doody was a member of the Chicago Fire Academy for three seasons before spending his college career at Indiana University.  He made a total of 86 appearances for the Hoosiers and tallied six goals and 12 assists, helping lead them to a College Cup title in 2012.

Doody also played in the Premier Development League for Chicago Fire U-23.

Professional
On December 22, 2014, Doody signed a homegrown contract with the Chicago Fire.  On March 20, he was sent on loan to United Soccer League affiliate club Saint Louis FC.  He made his professional debut for the club a week later in a 2–0 defeat to Louisville City FC.

On November 30, 2015, the Fire exercised their contract option on Doody, retaining him for the 2016 season, then again sent him on loan to Saint Louis FC on March 25, 2016.

On November 23, 2016, Doody's contract option was exercised by the Fire, keeping him with the club for another season. After not making any appearances for the club, he was loaned back out to Saint Louis FC until he was recalled back to the Fire on July 25, 2017.

References

External links

Indiana Hoosiers bio

1992 births
Living people
American soccer players
Association football defenders
Chicago Fire FC players
Chicago Fire U-23 players
Homegrown Players (MLS)
Indiana Hoosiers men's soccer players
Major League Soccer players
Saint Louis FC players
Soccer players from Illinois
Sportspeople from Naperville, Illinois
USL Championship players
USL League Two players